The Virtual Collection of Asian Masterpieces (VCM) shares more than 2,700 Masterpieces of Asian culture online. Since its launch in 2007 more than 145 museums in Asia and Europe have joined the VCM.

The VCM is originally a project of the ASEMUS - the Asia-Europe Museums Network. The VCM is now led by a consortium of five Asian and European museums:
National Museum of Korea, Seoul, South Korea
Chester Beatty Library, Dublin, Ireland
National Museum of Ethnology (Rijksmuseum Volkenkunde), Leiden, The Netherlands
Tropenmuseum, Amsterdam, The Netherlands

Museum of World Culture, Gothenburg, Sweden

References

External links 
Official site

Art websites
Works about the arts
Asian art